CEN/TC 251 (CEN Technical Committee 251) is a technical decision making body within the European Committee for Standardization (CEN) working on standardization in the field of Health Information and Communications Technology (ICT) in the European Union. The goal is to achieve compatibility and interoperability between independent systems and to enable modularity in Electronic Health Record systems.

Workgroups establish requirements for health information structure in order to support clinical and administrative procedures, technical methods to support interoperable systems. In addition they establish requirements regarding safety, security and quality.

Workgroups
The two Working Groups (WGs) in CEN/TC 251 are :
WG 1: Enterprise and Information
WG 2: Technology and Applications

See also
 ContSys
 EHRcom
 European Institute for Health Records
 Health Informatics Service Architecture (HISA)
 HIPAA (USA)
 Health Level 7 International
 International Classification of Primary Care (ICPC)
 ISO TC 215
 openEHR Foundation
 ProRec

External links
 CEN/TC 251 - Published standards
 CEN/TC 251 is a member of the Global Health Informatics Standardization
 Joint Initiative Council
 

Standards for electronic health records
EN standards
CEN technical committees